Flag Officer Commanding Eastern Fleet (FOCEF) is the title of the Indian Navy Officer who commands the Eastern Fleet, headquartered in Visakhapatnam, Andhra Pradesh. The FOCEF is a Two Star Officer holding the rank of Rear Admiral. The Current FOCEF is Rear Admiral Gurcharan Singh, who assumed office on 30 November 2022.

History
After the independence and the partition of India on 15 August 1947, the ships and personnel of the Royal Indian Navy were divided between the Dominion of India and the Dominion of Pakistan. The division of the ships was on the basis of two-thirds of the fleet to India, one third to Pakistan.

The operational ships of the remaining Royal Indian Navy, minus Pakistan, were initially placed under the command of the Commodore Commanding Indian Naval Squadron (COMINS), later the Rear-Admiral Commanding Indian Naval Squadron (RACINS), whose title was then changed to Flag Officer (Flotilla) Indian Fleet (FOFIF). The Flotilla was later upgraded to the Indian Fleet under a Flag Officer Commanding Indian Fleet (FOCIF).

On the proclamation of a Republic in 1950, the 'Royal' title was dropped and the Navy became simply the Indian Navy. Barnard was succeeded by Rear Admiral N.V. ("Uncle Richard") Dickinson, Rear Admiral F.A. Ballance, and then the final British officer Rear Admiral St John Tyrwhitt as FOCIF. In 1956, Rear Admiral Ram Dass Katari became the first Indian flag officer, and was appointed the first Indian FOCIF on 2 October, when he took over from Rear Admiral Tyrwhitt. (title alternately given as Flag Officer (Flotilla)). In 1957,  was commissioned, and the flag of Rear Admiral Katari was transferred, INS Mysore thus becoming the flagship of the Indian Fleet.

On 1 March 1968, the Eastern Naval Command was established and the Indian Fleet was renamed as the Western Fleet. In September 1971, Rear Admiral S H Sarma was summoned by the Chief of the Naval Staff, Admiral S M Nanda who told him that he was to move to Visakhapatnam and take up command of the yet-to-be-formed Eastern Fleet. The two-fleet concept of the Navy came into force with the constitution of the Eastern Fleet on 1 November 1971. Rear Admiral Sarma took over as the founding Flag Officer Commanding Eastern Fleet (FOCEF). In mid 1971, The aircraft carrier , along with the frigates INS Brahmaputra and INS Beas were moved from the Western Fleet to the Eastern Naval Command. Thus, INS Vikrant became the flagship of the Eastern Fleet.

List of commanders

See also
 Eastern Fleet
 Flag Officer Commanding Western Fleet

References

Indian Navy
Indian military appointments
Indian Navy appointments